During the 1999–2000 season, SV Werder Bremen played in the 1. Bundesliga, the highest tier of the German football league system.

Season summary
Having barely escaped relegation last season, Bremen rose to 9th in the final table - 6 points off Champions League qualification. The club also qualified for the UEFA Cup again, giving them the chance to improve on that season's run to the quarter-finals. The team also reached the DFB-Pokal final for the second season running, but lost to Bayern Munich.

First team squad
Squad at end of season

Left club during season

References

Notes

SV Werder Bremen seasons
Werder Bremen